Ernest John Roney (8 June 1900 – 23 March 1975) was a sailor from Great Britain, who represented his country at the 1924 Summer Olympics in Le Havre, France. Roney took the silver in the 8 Metre. In the 1928 competition he came 7th. He was the brother of Margaret Roney and Esmond Roney.

References

Sources
 

1900 births
1975 deaths
British male sailors (sport)
Olympic sailors of Great Britain
Sailors at the 1924 Summer Olympics – 8 Metre
Sailors at the 1928 Summer Olympics – 8 Metre
Medalists at the 1924 Summer Olympics
Olympic silver medallists for Great Britain
Olympic medalists in sailing
Alumni of Merton College, Oxford